The Assault Amphibious Vehicle (AAV)—official designation AAVP-7A1 (formerly known as Landing Vehicle, Tracked, Personnel-7 abbr. LVTP-7)—is a fully tracked amphibious landing vehicle manufactured by U.S. Combat Systems (previously by United Defense, a former division of FMC Corporation).

The AAV-P7/A1 is the current amphibious troop transport of the United States Marine Corps. It is used by U.S. Marine Corps Amphibious Assault Battalions to land the surface assault elements of the landing force and their equipment in a single lift from assault shipping during amphibious operations to inland objectives and to conduct mechanized operations and related combat support in subsequent mechanized operations ashore. It is also operated by other forces. Marines call them "amtracs", a shortening of their original designation, "amphibious tractor".

In June 2018, the Marine Corps announced they had selected the BAE Systems/Iveco wheeled SuperAV for the Amphibious Combat Vehicle (ACV) program to supplement and ultimately replace the AAV.

History

Development

The U.S. Marine Corps became interested in replacing the LVTP-5 due to its limited range, slow water speed and the difficulty of maintaining the aging platform. In 1964, the Marine Corps solicited proposals to replace meet its requirement. The Marine Corps selected a proposal by FMC. FMC delivered the first of 15 prototypes, designated LVTPX12, in October 1967. Marine Corps testing concluded in September 1969. In June 1970, the Marine Corps awarded FMC a $78.5 million contract for the production of 942 vehicles.

The LVTP-7 was first introduced in 1972. In 1982, FMC was contracted to conduct the LVTP-7 Service Life Extension Program (SLEP), which converted the LVT-7 vehicles to the improved AAV-7A1 vehicle by adding an improved engine, transmission, and weapons system and improving the overall maintainability of the vehicle. The Cummins VT400 diesel engine replaced the GM 8V53T, and this was driven through FMC's HS-400-3A1 transmission. The hydraulic traverse and elevation of the weapon station was replaced by electric motors, which eliminated the danger from hydraulic fluid fires. The suspension and shock absorbers were strengthened as well. The fuel tank was made safer, and a fuel-burning smoke generator system was added. Eight smoke grenade launchers were also placed around the armament station. The headlight clusters were housed in a square recess instead of the earlier round type. The driver was provided with an improved instrument panel and a night vision device, and a new ventilation system was installed. These upgraded vehicles were originally called LVT-7A1, but the Marine Corps renamed the LVTP-7A1 to AAV-7A1 in 1984.

Another improvement was added starting in 1987 in the form of a Cadillac Gage weapon station or Up-Gunned Weapon Station (UGWS) which was armed with both a .50 cal (12.7 mm) M2HB machine gun and a Mk-19 40 mm grenade launcher.

Enhanced Applique Armor Kits (EAAK) were developed for the AAV-7A1 in 1989 and fitted by 1993, and the added weight of the new armor necessitated the addition of a bow plane kit when operating afloat.

The Assault Amphibious Vehicle Reliability, Availability, Maintainability/Rebuild to Standard (AAV RAM/RS) Program was approved in 1997. It encompassed all AAV systems and components to return the AAV to the original vehicle's performance specifications and ensure acceptable readiness until the EFV should become operational. The program replaced both the AAV engine and suspension with US Army M2 Bradley Fighting Vehicle (BFV) components modified for the AAV. The introduction of the BFV components and the rebuild to standard effort was expected to reduce maintenance costs for the expected remaining life of the AAV through the year 2013.

In March 2015, SAIC was awarded a contract to perform an AAV Survivability Upgrade (SU). Marine Corps and SAIC officials unveiled the AAV SU prototype in January 2016, with survivability enhancements including replacing the angled EAAK with 49 advanced buoyant ceramic armor panels, a bonded spall liner, armor-protected external fuel tanks, an aluminum armor underbelly providing Mine Resistant Ambush Protected (MRAP)-equivalent blast protection, and blast mitigating seats as well as a more powerful engine, new suspension system, and increased reserve buoyancy. The AAV SU program was intended to upgrade 392 out of the some 1,000-vehicle fleet to keep them operational through 2035 as the ACV gradually entered service. However, in August 2018 the Marine Corps terminated the AAV upgrade program, instead opting for increased procurement of the ACV.

Combat history

Twenty U.S.-built LVTP-7s were used by Argentina during the 1982 invasion of the Falkland Islands with most returning to the Argentine mainland before the war ended.

From 1982 to 1984, LVTP-7s were deployed with U.S. Marines as part of the multi-national peacekeeping force in Beirut, Lebanon. As Marines became increasingly involved in hostilities, several vehicles sustained minor damage from shrapnel and small arms fire.

On October 25, 1983 U.S. Marine LVTP-7s conducted a highly successful amphibious landing on the island of Grenada as part of Operation Urgent Fury.

It was heavily used in the 1991 Gulf War and Operation Restore Hope.

After the 2003 invasion of Iraq, AAV-7A1s were criticized for providing poor protection for the crew and passengers compared with other vehicles, such as the M2 Bradley. Eight were disabled or destroyed during the Battle of Nasiriyah, where they faced RPG, mortar, tank and artillery fire. At least one vehicle was destroyed by fire from friendly A-10 Warthog aircraft.

On 3 August 2005, 14 U.S. Marines and their Iraqi interpreter were killed when their AAV struck a roadside bomb in the city of Haditha in the Euphrates river valley in western Iraq.

Eight U.S. Marines and one U.S. Navy sailor died on 30 July 2020, when their AAV sank in the Pacific Ocean off the coast of San Clemente Island, California, during a training exercise, ahead of an upcoming deployment. As a result of the incident, on 15 December 2021 the U.S. Marine Corps announced that it has banned its fleet of amphibious armored personnel carriers from maritime operations except in emergencies.

Replacement attempts

Cancelled: Expeditionary Fighting Vehicle
Renamed from the Advanced Assault Amphibious Vehicle in late 2003, the Expeditionary Fighting Vehicle (EFV) was designed to replace the aging AAV. Able to transport a full Marine rifle squad to shore from an amphibious assault ship beyond the horizon with three times the speed in water and about twice the armor of the AAV, and superior firepower as well it was the Marine Corps' number one priority ground weapon system acquisition. The EFV was intended for deployment in 2015. However, in January 2011, United States Defense Secretary Robert Gates announced plans to cancel the Expeditionary Fighting Vehicle. In 2012, the USMC dropped the EFV and cancelled the program.

Replacement: Amphibious Combat Vehicle
In June 2018, the Marine Corps announced they had selected the BAE Systems/Iveco wheeled SuperAV for the Amphibious Combat Vehicle (ACV) program to supplement and ultimately replace the AAV.

Variants

 LVTP-7: Original series introduced from 1972. Originally armed with a M85 12.7 mm (.50cal) machine gun.
 LVTP-7A1: 1982 upgraded. Renamed to AAVP-7A1 from 1984.
 AAVP-7A1 (Personnel): This is the most common AAV, as it carries a turret equipped with an M2HB 12.7 mm (.50 caliber) heavy machine gun, and a Mk19 40 mm automatic grenade launcher. It carries four crew radios as well as the AN/VIC-2 intercom system. It is capable of carrying 21 combat equipped Marines in addition to the crew of 4: driver, crew chief/vehicle commander, gunner, and rear crewman.
 AAVC-7A1 (Command): This vehicle does not have a turret, and much of the cargo space of the vehicle is occupied by communications equipment. This version only has two crew radios, and in addition to the VIC-2, it also carries two VRC-92s, a VRC-89, a PRC-103 UHF radio, a MRC-83 HF radio and the MSQ internetworking system used to control the various radios. This AAV has a crew of 3, and additionally carries 5 radio operators, 3 staff members, and 2 commanding officers. Recently, the C7 has been upgraded to use Harris Falcon II class radios, specifically the PRC-117 for VHF/UHF/SATCOM, and the PRC-150 for HF.
 AAVR-7A1 (Recovery): This vehicle also does not have a turret. The R7 is considered the "wrecker", as it has a crane as well as most tools and equipment needed for field repairs. It is by far the heaviest of the three, and sits considerably lower in the water. Crew of three, plus the repairmen.

Many P7s have been modified to carry the Mk 154 MCLC, or Mine Clearance Line Charge. The MCLC kit can fire three linear demolition charges to breach a lane through a minefield. MCLCs were used in the 1991 Persian Gulf War and again in Operation Iraqi Freedom in 2003.

In the 1970s, the U.S. Army used an LVTP-7 as the basis for their Mobile Test Unit (MTU), a ground-based high-energy anti-aircraft laser. After several successful test firings at Redstone Army Arsenal, the laser was reportedly transferred to NASA.
 KAAV7A1: KAAV7A1 amphibious vehicle series based on AAV-7A1 by Samsung Techwin (now Hanwha Defense) and BAE systems developed and manufactured in South Korea by Samsung Techwin.

Training systems
The Office of Naval Research (ONR) under the Virtual Training and Environments (VIRTE) program, led by then LCDR Dylan Schmorrow, developed a prototype training system called the AAV Turret Trainer. The system consists of an actual surplus turret mounted with ISMT (Indoor Simulated Marksmanship Trainer) weapons firing on a projected screen displaying the VIRTE Virtual Environment. A total of 15 systems were produced for the USMC and one system for Taiwan.

Operators

 : Naval Infantry Command originally received 21 vehicles (19 LVTP-7, 1 LVTP-7 and 1 LVTR-7), 11 of them (9 LVTP-7, 1 LVTC-7 and 1 LVTR-7) were upgraded locally by MECATROL with Caterpillar C7 diesel engines and minor changes to running gear and other components
 : Brazilian Marine Corps has 49
 : 76 will be procured for use with the Hellenic Marine Corps of the Hellenic Navy
 : 15 in service with the Indonesian Marine Corps; donated by South Korea.
 : Due to be replaced by the Italian Marines.
 : Amphibious Rapid Deployment Brigade has 58 (46 personnel, 6 command and 6 recovery) After a period of testing 6 AAVP-7A1s, Japan on 7 April 2016 announced it would purchase 30 systems. Vehicles are AAV7A1 Reliability, Availability, and Maintainability/Rebuild to Standard (RAM/RS) versions, with a more powerful engine and drive train and an upgraded suspension system, providing improved mobility, command, control and repair capabilities. Deliveries to take place in mid to late 2017.
 : Philippine Marine Corps All 8 AAV units has been delivered as of 2019 and currently operated by the Philippine Marine Corps, plans to order at least 16.
 : Republic of China Marine Corps has 90 (78 personnel, 8 command and 4 recovery) and 1 AAV Turret Trainer. Thirty-six currently on order for $375 million USD.
 : Spanish Navy Marines have 19 (16 personnel, 2 command and 1 recovery)
 : Republic of Korea Marine Corps has approximately 168 KAAV variants
 : Royal Thai Marine Corps has 36, AAVP-7A1, AAVC-7A1, AAVR-7A1. Upgraded locally by Chaiseri to match with the BAE Systems's AAV7A1 RAM/RS standard. On March 10, 2022, it is reported that Chaiseri will create a local version, known as the AAVP1A1.
 : United States Marine Corps possesses 1,311 of them.

See also

 3rd Assault Amphibian Battalion
 WWII/Korea LVT Museum

Notes

External links

 FAS AAV article
 AAV Fact File at the official USMC website
 Paper regarding high energy lasers and the MTU
 Images of the MTU
 AAV 7A1 on Armour.ws
 USMC Amtrac Association Website

Tracked amphibious vehicles
Vehicles introduced in 1972
Armoured personnel carriers of South Korea
Armoured personnel carriers of Japan
Armored personnel carriers of the United States
Amphibious armoured personnel carriers
FMC Corporation
Military vehicles introduced in the 1970s